Maaskantje is a village in the province of North Brabant, Netherlands. The village is part of the municipality of Sint-Michielsgestel, southeast of 's-Hertogenbosch.

History
The village was first mentioned in 1750 as "nabij het Maaskantje te Gestel", and means "near the mud".

Maaskantje was home to 424 people in 1840. Around 1900, Maaskantje and Den Dungen started to merge into a single urban area. Before 1996, Maaskantje was part of the municipality of Den Dungen instead of the municipality of Sint-Michielsgestel. In 1996, Den Dungen became part of Sint-Michielsgestel.

The Dutch Comedy Central sketch show New Kids that takes place in the village has generated tourism to the village. The village's signs were stolen by New Kids fans and the municipality decided not to replace them.

Trivia
Maaskantje became internationally known through the Dutch comedy series New Kids and the movies New Kids Turbo and New Kids Nitro. The series is broadcast by Comedy Central in several countries. The main characters of the series pose in front of the Maaskantje town sign in most of the sketches. Some of the skits were also filmed locally, most in the neighboring village of Den Dungen. The music video for Friends Turbo by the Eurodance band Scooter was filmed in the village.

Due to the popularity of the films and skits, the place has become a popular destination for fans of the New Kids. Since the Maaskantje town sign was a very coveted trophy for the fans, it was often dismantled and stolen and therefore not put up again in the meantime.

References

External links 
 

Populated places in North Brabant
Sint-Michielsgestel